Podstrmec is a dispersed settlement southwest of Velike Lašče in Slovenia. The entire Municipality of Velike Lašče is part of the traditional region of Lower Carniola and is now included in the Central Slovenia Statistical Region.

References

External links

Podstrmec on Geopedia

Populated places in the Municipality of Velike Lašče